Fairwood was a Hansa A Type cargo ship which was built as Celia in 1943 by Lübecker Maschinenbau-Gesellschaft, Lübeck, Germany for A. Kirsten, Hamburg, Germany. She was seized as a prize of war in 1945, passing to the Ministry of War Transport and renamed Empire Gallant. She was sold in 1947 and was renamed Richard Borchard. She was sold in 1960 to West Germany  and was renamed Fairwood. She served until 1963 when she was scrapped.

Description

The ship was propelled by a compound steam engine, which had two cylinders of 42 cm (16 inches) and two cylinders of 90 cm (35 inches) diameter by 90 cm (35 inches) stroke. The engine was built by Waggon- und Maschinenbau GmbH, Görlitz.

History
Celia was a Hansa A Type cargo ship built in 1943 as yard number 402 by  Lübecker Maschinenbau-Gesellschaft, Lübeck, Germany for A. Kirsten, Hamburg. She wascompleted in January 1944. Her port of registry was Hamburg.

In May 1945, Celia was seized as a prize of war at Kiel. She was passed to the Ministry of War Transport. She was renamed Empire Gallant. The Code Letters GJGX and United Kingdom Official Number 180613 were allocated. Her port of registry was London and she was operated under the management of the London & Edinburgh Shipping Co. Ltd, Leith.

In 1947 Empire Gallant was sold to Borchard (UK) Ltd and was renamed Richard Borchard. Following the Israeli Declaration of Independence and the start of the Arab–Israeli War, Egypt instigated a policy of confiscating goods in transport to Palestine that would be of use to the Egyptian military effort. Richard Borchard was at Alexandria on May 17. Her cargo of aluminium, dried fruit, machinery, motor vehicles, seaweed and tin was confiscated. It was claimed that she was a Zionist vessel owned in Italy. She stopped after a shot was fired across her bows and was allowed to proceed after a rudimentary search for contraband goods had been made.

In 1960, Richard Borchard was sold to Fairplay Schleppdampfschiffahrt Reederei, Hamburg and renamed Fairwood. She was operated under the management of Richard Borchard GmbH. With their introduction in the 1960s, Fairwood was allocated the IMO Number 5111854. She served until January 1963 when she was scrapped at Sarpsborg, Norway by Østfold Skipshopphugging.

References

1943 ships
Ships built in Lübeck
World War II merchant ships of Germany
Steamships of Germany
Empire ships
Ministry of War Transport ships
Merchant ships of the United Kingdom
Steamships of the United Kingdom
1948 Arab–Israeli War
1949 in Israel
Merchant ships of West Germany
Steamships of West Germany